The Lazio Pigeon Shooting Stand was a temporary firing range built near the Olympic village in Rome. It was used for the trap shooting event for the 1960 Summer Olympics.

References
1960 Summer Olympics official report. Volume 1. pp. 66–7.
1960 Summer Olympics official report. Volume 2. Part 2. p. 932.
Roma1960.it venue profile.

Venues of the 1960 Summer Olympics
Olympic shooting venues
Defunct sports venues in Italy